Sir Edmund Knowles Lacon, 2nd Baronet (28 February 1780 – 3 June 1839) of Ormesby House (now Ormesby Old Hall), near Great Yarmouth, Norfolk was an English Mayor of Great Yarmouth, High Sheriff of Norfolk and Member of Parliament.

He was the only son of Sir Edmund Lacon, 1st Baronet of Ormesby House and educated at Gilpin's School in Cheam, Eton College (1793) and Emmanuel College, Cambridge 1797–1801 before entering Lincoln's Inn in 1799 to study law. He succeeded his father in 1820.

He was elected Mayor of Great Yarmouth for 1807 and Member of Parliament for Great Yarmouth in 1812, sitting until 1818. He was picked High Sheriff of Norfolk for
1823–24.

He married in 1804 Eliza Dixon, the daughter and coheiress of Thomas Beecroft of Saxthorpe Hall, Norfolk and had  3 sons and 3 daughters. He was succeeded by Sir Edmund Lacon, 3rd Baronet.

Arms

References

|-

1780 births
1839 deaths
People from Great Yarmouth
Members of Lincoln's Inn
Baronets in the Baronetage of the United Kingdom
Members of the Parliament of the United Kingdom for English constituencies
UK MPs 1812–1818
High Sheriffs of Norfolk
People educated at Eton College
English barristers